Sonia Roca is the Chancellor and Founder of Universidad Del Pacífico - Ecuador.

Biography
Sonia Roca is an Ecuadorian attorney, political figure, and founder of Universidad Del Pacifico: Escuela de Negocios.

Career

Political & International Organizations
Roca began her career as a maritime attorney in the role of a civilian legal advisor to the Ecuadorian Merchant Marines
 
1972, and returned in 1977 to direct the creation of the Direction of Maritime Affairs for Ecuador.

 From 1973 to 1976 she headed the secretariat of the permanent council for the Organization of American States under Secretary General Galo Plaza Lasso. Where she was the Executive Secretaryl for the Interamerican Commission for Women and negotiated in the OAS General Assembly (Atlanta 1974) for the adoption of the International Women's Year 1975.

During the government of Leon Febres Cordero Roca worked in the secretariat of the Vice Presidency under Blasco Peñaherrera. During this period she worked with the First Lady María Eugenia Cordovez in the operation of the Instituto Nacional del Niño y la Familia (INNFA- National Institute for Family and Children) and the implementation of the Programa de Reducción de la Enfermedad Mortal Infantil (Premi). She was appointed as Intendent of Corporations for Quito  in the Superintendence of Corporations.

During the presidential elections of 2002 and 2006 she led the electoral campaign for presidential candidateLeon Roldos. In 2007 she was a candidate for the Constitutional Assembly. She was considered as a vice presidential candidate during the 2012 elections.

Academia
From 1978 to 1996 she was legal advisor to Academia Cotopaxi. In 1988 she became the representative of INCAE Instituto Centro Americano de Administración de Empresas for Ecuador.

 
In 1992 she started the Fundación para el Desarrollo de la Cultura Empresarial (Foundation for the Development of Corporate Culture), which in turn led to the operation of Escuela de Negocios del Pacífico and after approval by the Ecuadorian Congress was enacted into law as Universidad del Pacífico: Escuela de Negocios

Social Movement
In 2020 Sonia Roca began Nuestro Oceano Pacifico (Our Pacific Ocean) a movement to encourage understanding with regards to the rights and obligations that Ecuadorian citizens have with the Pacific Ocean  which consists of a Maritime Citizens Council as well as a think tank.

Awards and recognitions
Presea Jaime Nebot Saadi (2021)
Member of the South South Cooperation Council (SSCC) (2016) 
Academic Excellence Award Amity University (2018) 
Medalla al Merito Educativo Matilde Hidalgo de Procel – Congressional Merit Awarded (2007) 
Ph.D. Honoris Causa – Asia Pacific International University – Canada (2000)
Member of the Honorary Council for Foreign Affairs 
Member of Board of Directors Quito Chamber of Commerce

Works
Roca, S. (2019). Una Mirada Ética sobre el Pacífico Latinoamericano. In M. Palacios & D. Soto (Eds.), Pensar un Pacífico Latinoamericano: Retos Políticos, Éticos y Medioambientales (First Edition, pp. 13–17). Introduction, Editorial UPACIFICO 
 Roca, S. (2016). Prologue. In M. Palacios & D. Soto (Eds.), Ecuador País Marítimo: Ensayos sobre Recursos Naturales, Desarrollo y Gobernanza (First Edition, pp. 12–17), Editorial UPACIFICO. ISB: 978-9942-8633-0-0 

 Roca, S. (2014). ¿Que Hace el Ecuador fuera de la Alianza del Pacífico? Revista Carácter, 2(1), 23–45.
 Roca, S. (2004). Ecuador: A Vision Toward The APEC. Viña del Mar, Chile; Asia Pacific Economic Cooperation.
 Roca, S. (2002). Inserción del Ecuador a la Cuenca del Pacífico. ¿Qué debemos esperar del nuevo gobierno? Comentario Internacional. Revista Del Centro Andino De Estudios Internacionales, (4), 133–138.
 Roca, S. (1968). La Función Social del Estado (Graduation thesis).

Collaborative Works
 Manual de Contrataciones “Sistema Uniforme de Contrataciones” (General Secretariat OAS) 
 United Nations Convention on the Carriage of Goods by Sea (Hamburg, 1978) (the "Hamburg Rules") – Lead Contributor for Latin America 
 Índice y anteproyecto del Código de Navegación Marítima y Fluvial (DIMERC) 1972
 Legal Reforms to Ecuadorian Naviation Legislation and new legislation for national maritime interests (DIMERC)
 Revista Jornada de la Navegación, Editor and Promotor (DIMERC).
 Organized three events with international experts and conference editor

References

External links
upacifico.edu.ec, university's official website (in Spanish)

Heads of universities in Ecuador
Women heads of universities and colleges
Ecuadorian academics
Women academics
Ecuadorian businesspeople
1945 births
Living people
Ecuadorian women in politics
People from Guayaquil